Emerson Perin (born 17 March 1975) is a Brazilian hurdler. He competed in the men's 110 metres hurdles at the 1996 Summer Olympics.

References

1975 births
Living people
Athletes (track and field) at the 1995 Pan American Games
Athletes (track and field) at the 1996 Summer Olympics
Brazilian male hurdlers
Olympic athletes of Brazil
Place of birth missing (living people)
Pan American Games athletes for Brazil